Da Vinci's Demons is a historical fantasy drama series that presents a fictional account of Leonardo da Vinci's early life. The series was conceived by David S. Goyer and stars Tom Riley in the title role. It was developed and produced in collaboration with BBC Worldwide and was shot in Wales. The series has been distributed to over 120 countries.

The show follows Leonardo as he is implicated in the political schemes of the Medici and Pazzi families and their contrasting relationships with the Catholic Church. These events occur alongside Leonardo's quest to obtain a mystical text called the Book of Leaves, which leads him to become entangled with a cult known as the Sons of Mithras.

The series premiered in the United States on Starz on 12 April 2013, and its second season premiered on 22 March 2014. The series was renewed for a third season, which premiered on 24 October 2015. On 23 July 2015, Starz announced that the third season would be the show's last. However, Goyer has left it open for a miniseries return.

Plot
A fictionalised story based on historical persons, the series explores the early life of Leonardo da Vinci during the Renaissance in Italy. He is an eccentric genius who has struggled to deal with his inner demons and unruly imagination, as he yearns for acceptance from his estranged father. Their sometimes antagonistic relationship results in Leonardo's working for the House of Medici. While doing so, he becomes embroiled in a political scheme to control Florence, as he hunts for a spy who is revealing information to the Catholic Church and the Pazzi family. He also begins an affair with Lucrezia Donati, Lorenzo de' Medici's mistress. The series depicts many of Leonardo's inventions and subsequent works as a military engineer for the Duke of Milan and the Borgias.

These events coincide with Leonardo's quest to uncover the Book of Leaves, which a mysterious cult known as the Sons of Mithras also consider very important. Mystics and the cult guided him to unlock the 'hidden areas of his mind' by accessing the Fountain of Memory, and inform him that he has the power to see the future and also to shape it.

In terms of historical accuracy, the show is highly fictionalized, and this is already (and deliberately) made explicit the first episode, playing 1475–1476 (persecution for sodomy 1476; before the Pazzi conspiracy of 1478), when potatoes and tobacco (this one even in the very first dialog) are presented as something commonplace – 15 years before America was even discovered. Likewise, Mithraism had already fully disappeared during Late Antiquity.

Cast and characters

Main

 Tom Riley as Leonardo da Vinci
 Laura Haddock as Lucrezia Donati
 Blake Ritson as Count Girolamo Riario
 Elliot Cowan as Lorenzo de' Medici
 Lara Pulver as Clarice Orsini
 James Faulkner as Pope Sixtus IV – Francesco & Alessandro della Rovere (seasons 2–3; recurring season 1)
 Gregg Chillin as Zoroaster da Peretola (season 3; recurring seasons 1–2)
 Victor Piccone as Luciano Piccone (season 2; recurring seasons 1–2)

Recurring

 Hera Hilmar as Vanessa Moschella, outspoken Florentine barmaid and occasional model for Leonardo
 Eros Vlahos as Nico, apprentice to Leonardo
 David Schofield as Piero da Vinci, notary to Lorenzo and father to Leonardo
 Alexander Siddig as Aslan Al-Rahim, "The Turk"
 Tom Bateman as Giuliano de' Medici, brother to Lorenzo (seasons 1–2)
 Allan Corduner as Andrea Verrocchio (seasons 1–2)
 Michael Elwyn as Gentile Becchi (season 1)
 Michael Culkin as Jacopo Pazzi (seasons 1–2)
 Nick Dunning as Cardinal Lupo Mercuri, Curator of the Vatican Secret Archives
 Elliot Levey as Francesco de' Pazzi (seasons 1–2)
 Paul Rhys as Vlad Tepes (seasons 1, 3)
 Shaun Parkes as Solomon Ogbai, "The Abyssinian" (seasons 1–2)
 Vincent Riotta as Duke Federico da Montefeltro (seasons 1–2)
 Estella Daniels as Zita (supporting season 1; principal season 2)
 Carolina Guerra as Ima, High Priestess of the Children of the Sun (season 2)
 Ian Pirie as Captain Nazzareno Dragonetti (supporting season 1; principal seasons 2–3)
 Raoul Trujillo as the Sapa Inca (season 2)
 Kieran Bew as Alfonso, Duke of Calabria (seasons 2–3)
 Lee Boardman as Amerigo Vespucci (season 2)
 Matthew Marsh as Ferdinand I of Naples (season 2)
 Ray Fearon as Carlo de' Medici, illegitimate son of Cosimo de' Medici, "The Magician" (seasons 2–3)
 Richard Sammel as Hartweg (season 2)
 Jeany Spark as Ippolita Maria Sforza, Duchess of Calabria (season 2)
 Sasha Behar as The Seer / Caterina, Leonardo's mother (supporting season 2; principal season 3)
 Akin Gazi as Bayezid II (supporting season 2; principal season 3)
 Simone Lahbib as Laura Cereta (season 3)
 Paul Freeman as The Architect / Asterion (season 3)
 Jude Wright as Andrea da Vinci (dream-sequence) (season 3)
 Dafydd Emyr as Captain of the Labyrinth (dream-sequence) (season 3)
 Sabrina Bartlett as Sophia (season 3)

Guest and cameo

 Ross O'Hennessy as Commander Quattrone (seasons 1–2)
 David Sturzaker as Bernardo Baroncelli (season 1)
 Simon Armstrong as Scarpa (season 1)
 Hugh Bonneville as Galeazzo Maria Sforza (cameo season 1)
 Tom Wu as Quon Shan (season 2)
 Ieuan Rhys as Councilman De'Rossi (season 3)
 Paul Rhys as Vlad the Impaler (four episodes)
 Ruby Stokes as Amelia (two episodes)

Casting
Tom Riley was the first actor to be cast in the series, as The Hollywood Reporter announced he had landed the role as Leonardo da Vinci. Goyer and managing director Carmi Zlotnik revealed he was cast as he could portray the character with many dimensions that would appeal to a worldwide audience. They later reported that Laura Haddock had been cast in the female lead as Lucrezia Donati.

Production
The series has marked the first collaboration between Starz and BBC Worldwide following a new production agreement. Fox International Channels picked up the series for global distribution. The show was created by Goyer, who directed the first two episodes and wrote several others along writers such as Scott Gimple, Brian Nelson and Joe Ahearne.

Filming for the series took place in the United Kingdom, at Swansea, Neath, Port Talbot and Margam Castle in Wales. A  studio in Swansea Gate Business Park was also used and several sets were built to resemble 15th-century Florence. Annie Symons was brought on board as the lead costume designer. Bear McCreary composed the score for the series, and orchestrated the main theme to reflect Leonardo's use of mirror writing. Goyer had a scene in episode five depicting a kiss between Leonardo and Jacopo Saltarelli filmed in secret as he feared network interference.

Goyer revealed to USA Today at the New York Comic Con that season two would also be set in South America and would feature Machu Picchu and the Inca Empire. Goyer claimed that this was justified by "new research" that has revealed Chinese and European explorers may have arrived in the New World earlier than was originally believed.

Sexuality of Leonardo
There is widespread belief that Leonardo was primarily if not exclusively sexually attracted to and involved with men. Goyer acknowledged this and said that the show would not shy away from the subject. Riley cited that because the speculation exists it is something that should be honoured.

In a later interview with the gay-interest website The Backlot, Riley expressed his hope that the episode addressed concerns about the show's depiction of Leonardo's sexuality in a way that is satisfactory and respectful to any historical beliefs.

Episodes

Series overview

Season 1 (2013)

Season 2 (2014)

Season 3 (2015)
On October 24, 2015, Starz released the full third season of Da Vinci's Demons on-demand.

Reception
Season 1 has received favourable reviews from critics. It holds a 63% approval rating on aggregate review site Rotten Tomatoes, based on 32 collected critic reviews, with an average score of 6.1/10. The sites consensus reads: "Despite its preposterous plotting and lack of historical accuracy, Da Vinci's Demons is energetic, enjoyable escapist television." It also holds a Metacritic score of 62 out of 100, based on 27 critics reviews, indicating "generally favorable reviews".

Accolades
Da Vinci's Demons received three nominations for Outstanding Main Title Design, Outstanding Main Title Theme Music and Outstanding Special Visual Effects at the 65th Primetime Creative Arts Emmy Awards. The series won Main Title Design and Main Title Theme Music, but lost Visual Effects to the Cinemax series Banshee.

Home media

See also
 Cultural depictions of Leonardo da Vinci
 Leonardo, a 2011–2012 children's television series from the BBC
 Personal life of Leonardo da Vinci

References

External links

 
 

2010s American LGBT-related drama television series
2010s British drama television series
2013 American television series debuts
2013 British television series debuts
2015 American television series endings
2015 British television series endings
American adventure television series
Starz original programming
Television series by BBC Studios
British adventure television series
2010s British LGBT-related drama television series
Cultural depictions of Lorenzo de' Medici
Cultural depictions of Niccolò Machiavelli
Cultural depictions of Vlad the Impaler
Depictions of Leonardo da Vinci on television
English-language television shows
Television shows set in Florence
Pope Sixtus IV
Serial drama television series
Television series set in the 15th century
Television series set in the Renaissance
Television shows set in Italy
Television shows set in Turkey
Television series created by David S. Goyer
Works about Leonardo da Vinci